Trigo (Spanish for "Wheat") is an unincorporated community in Madera County, California.

History
Trigo was formerly called Patterson.

A post office operated at Trigo from 1912 to 1942.

References

Unincorporated communities in California
Unincorporated communities in Madera County, California